Humsey Hai Jahaan is a 2008 romance comedy Indian Bollywood film directed by Mashhoor Amrohi and produced by Tajdar Amrohi. It stars Mashhoor Amrohi, Vishakha Singh (in her Bollywood debut), Jackie Shroff in lead roles. The film was a box office failure.

Development
Mashoor Kamal Amrohi, the grandson of filmmaker and writer Kamal Amrohi debuted as an actor, director and scriptwriter of the film while the shooting of the film took place at Singapore. Vishakha Singh chose as a female lead.

Cast
Mashhoor Amrohi as Sameer Khanna
Vishakha Singh as Esha
Jackie Shroff as Gary Rosario
Kiran Kumar as Pran Panwara
A K Hangal as Mr. Wild West
Mukesh Rishi as Dabar
Shehzad Khan as Gyaneshwar Singh
Prem Chopra
Govinda (Special appearance)

Music
The music of the film is composed by Suhas, Siddharth and Abuzar while lyrics are penned by Kumaar.

Soundtrack

References

External links

2000s Hindi-language films